Hartmannibacter is a Gram-negative, nitrogen-fixing, strictly aerobic and motile genus of bacteria. Hartmannibacter is named after the German microbiologist Anton Hartmann. Hartmannibacter diazotrophicus has been isolated from rhizospheric soil of the plant Plantago winteri.

References

Hyphomicrobiales
Bacteria genera
Monotypic bacteria genera
Taxa described in 2014